The Province of Avellino is a province in the Campania region of Southern Italy. The area is characterized by numerous  small towns and villages scattered across the province; only two towns have a population over 20,000: its capital city Avellino (in the west) and Ariano Irpino (in the north).

Geography
There are 118 comuni in the province, with the main towns being Avellino and Ariano Irpino. See Comuni of the Province of Avellino.

It is an inner province, with no connection to the sea.

History

The ancient inhabitants of the area were the Hirpini, whose name stems from the Oscan term hirpus ("wolf"), an animal that is still present in the territory, though in greatly reduced numbers.

In the province of Avellino there are many archaeological Roman sites, with Aeclanum being the most important.

In the medieval  Kingdom of Naples (later Kingdom of Two Sicilies) the provincial area roughly corresponded to the Principato Ultra, though some places were included in Capitanata or Principato Citra. The modern province was established in 1860, after the unification of Italy.

Main sights

The Selachoidei National Gallery at Avellino houses one of the largest collections of cartilaginous fishes in the country, whereas the City Museum and Ceramics Gallery at Ariano Irpino shows a print room with a great display of typical .

Natural attractions include the   Monti Piacentini and Partenio Regional Parks, together with two WWF sites, Valle della Caccia in Senerchia and the area around the Ofanto dam in Conza della Campania.

Cuisine
Typical products are hazelnuts (one third of the whole Italian production), the chestnut of Montella, the renowned wines Aglianico, Taurasi, Greco di Tufo and Fiano di Avellino, cherries, cheeses (as the caciocavallo of Montella), the black truffle of Bagnoli Irpino, the olive oil of Ariano Irpino.

Comunes
 Aiello del Sabato
 Altavilla Irpina
 Andretta
 Aquilonia
 Ariano Irpino
 Atripalda
 Avella
 Avellino
 Bagnoli Irpino
 Baiano
 Bisaccia
 Bonito
 Cairano
 Calabritto
 Calitri
 Candida
 Caposele
 Capriglia Irpina
 Carife
 Casalbore
 Cassano Irpino
 Castel Baronia
 Castelfranci
 Castelvetere sul Calore
 Cervinara
 Cesinali
 Chianche
 Chiusano di San Domenico
 Contrada
 Conza della Campania
 Domicella
 Flumeri
 Fontanarosa
 Forino
 Frigento
 Gesualdo
 Greci
 Grottaminarda
 Grottolella
 Guardia Lombardi
 Lacedonia
 Lapio
 Lauro
 Lioni
 Luogosano
 Manocalzati
 Marzano di Nola
 Melito Irpino
 Mercogliano
 Mirabella Eclano
 Montaguto
 Montecalvo Irpino
 Montefalcione
 Monteforte Irpino
 Montefredane
 Montefusco
 Montella
 Montemarano
 Montemiletto
 Monteverde
 Montoro
 Morra De Sanctis
 Moschiano
 Mugnano del Cardinale
 Nusco
 Ospedaletto d'Alpinolo
 Pago del Vallo di Lauro
 Parolise
 Paternopoli
 Petruro Irpino
 Pietradefusi
 Pietrastornina
 Prata di Principato Ultra
 Pratola Serra
 Quadrelle
 Quindici
 Rocca San Felice
 Roccabascerana
 Rotondi
 Salza Irpina
 San Mango sul Calore
 San Martino Valle Caudina
 San Michele di Serino
 San Nicola Baronia
 San Potito Ultra
 San Sossio Baronia
 Santa Lucia di Serino
 Santa Paolina
 Sant'Andrea di Conza
 Sant'Angelo a Scala
 Sant'Angelo all'Esca
 Sant'Angelo dei Lombardi
 Santo Stefano del Sole
 Savignano Irpino
 Scampitella
 Senerchia
 Serino
 Sirignano
 Solofra
 Sorbo Serpico
 Sperone
 Sturno
 Summonte
 Taurano
 Taurasi
 Teora
 Torella dei Lombardi
 Torre Le Nocelle
 Torrioni
 Trevico
 Tufo
 Vallata
 Vallesaccarda
 Venticano
 Villamaina
 Villanova del Battista
 Volturara Irpina
 Zungoli

See also
Irpinia

References

External links

 Official website  

 
Avellino
Avellino